De la coupe aux lèvres is a 1920 French silent film directed by Guy du Fresnay.

Cast
Marguerite Madys   
Paul Capellani

External links 

1920 films
French black-and-white films
French drama short films
Films directed by Guy du Fresnay
French silent feature films
1920 drama films
1920 short films
Silent drama films
1920s French films